Sustainable Development Goals is a post Millennium Development Goal agenda  by experts in the world which will be implemented within  the next 15 years until 2030. It has seventeen goals and 169 targets as a whole where SDG 3 deal with ensuring health lives and promote well-being for all at all ages. Sustainable Development Goal 3 has nine targets and four sub targets related with different areas of health. One of the targets target 3.1 is a target to achieve a reduction of global maternal mortality ratio to less than 70 per 100,000 live births .Maternal death is defined as "The death of a woman while pregnant or within 42 days of termination of pregnancy, irrespective of the duration and the site of the pregnancy, from any cause related to or aggravated by the pregnancy or its management, but not from accidental or incidental causes.

Health in Ethiopia has improved from the last decades to then through the major achievement in areas of health service delivery by making health system accessible, affordable and acceptable at different level for the beneficiaries and put different efforts to provide quality health services care. The improvement in infrastructure, resource mobilization and leadership and governance in health sector and in the country as a whole have a key contribution for the achievements. Maternal health is one of the area where an attention given and different efforts and initiatives were being implemented with strong political will and commitment

Maternal health situation in Ethiopia
Following the MDGs target, Ethiopia developed the Health Sector Development Program (HSDP I,II,II,and IV along with performance monitoring and evaluation of the health services. The primary focus of HSDP is improving the provision of primary health care services to mothers and children and prevention and control of communicable diseases in order to reach the targeted outcome. Maternal and child health is the major area and target where different efforts and contributions have been made from the beginning of HSDP I.
According to Health Sector Development Plan IV (HSDP IV), which was being implemented from 2012 to 2015, the performance evaluation of 2013/14 indicated progress in achievement of family planning service coverage, antenatal care service coverage, institutional delivery and postnatal service coverage. Furthermore, access to emergency obstetric care in the reduction of maternal death during pregnancy and child birth through provision of Basic and Comprehensive Emergency Obstetric Care are the areas where special attention has been given and improvements have been observed.

The number of health centres and hospitals providing Basic Emergency Obstetric Care (BEmOC) and Comprehensive Emergency Obstetric Care (CEmOBC) has been increasing over time (Figure 1). There are 25 functional regional blood banks with 30 satellite mobile teams who are collecting the blood from the communities on a daily basis. The blood banks are located within 150 –200 km radius of their catchment are where both private and public health facilities are able to get safe blood

Maternal health indicators
Community based house hold surveys conducted in Ethiopia indicated that trends of process indicators of maternal health services including reduction of maternal death has been improved over time (Table 1). 
Maternal Mortality Ration (MMR) is one of the indicator to be measured every five to tenyears which is difficult to estimate changes in maternal mortality due to use of proximate denominator live born babies instead of number of pregnant women due to impossible ideal calculation of with any certainty especially in low and middle income countries where maternal mortality is very high. However assessment of a number of process indicators are recommended and used to track the changes and improvements. The common process indicators used are antenatal care coverage, skilled birth attendance, postnatal care and family planning.
Table 1.Maternal health indicators in Ethiopia 2014, Addis Ababa, Ethiopia

 EDHS: Ethiopia Demographic and Health Survey
 EMDHS: Ethiopian Mini Demographic and Health Survey

Human resource

The availability of key health providers particularly midwives and obstetric gynaecologists is very important in provision of maternal health service and in management of complications. In 2012 the number of midwives and obstetricians and gynaecologist was 6925 and 147 respectively (Ref.State of World Midwifery). Considering the shortage of obstetrician gynaecologists in the country ministry of health designed and started training of midlevel health providers; health officers to improve the provision of emergency surgery obstetrics care and surgical services at primary hospital level since 2009 where 163 of them graduated and have been deployed in different health facilities till 2013/14. As part of its drive to tackle maternal mortality, Maternal Death Surveillance and Response system was started since 2013 in Ethiopia which helps for improvement of quality of health service provision.

Maternal health services are being provided at all three levels of health sector structure : Primary, secondary and tertiary level in Ethiopia. At community level it is provided by Health Extension workers focusing on preventive services and promotion of skilled birth attendant. It is supported by community networking and ownership called Health Development Army that improve community ownership and further enable the community to produce and maintain its own health. At this level the major service provided are community mobilization, and awareness creation with some service provision such as contraceptive.

Similar to global situation,  the causes of maternal mortality in Ethiopia ranges from Obstructed labour and Postpartum bleeding where access to skilled birth attendant and emergency obstetric care have a crucial role for the survival of women during pregnancy, delivery and postnatal period.

Interesting Factors with regard to maternal health in Ethiopia as shown in Table 1
1.	There was a progressive improvement in all indicators, except for MMR, from 2000 to 2014
2.	Despite improvement in the other indicators and skilled human power, MMR escalated from 673 to 676 from 2005 to 2011 indicating the presence of other important contributing factors to MMR.

Maternal health trends in Ethiopia from 1950 to 2015 compared to the global situation
Evidences regarding maternal health condition in Ethiopia are available starting from 1990. According to the target set for tracking of annual reduction of maternal mortality Ethiopia is categorized under counties who are making progress to achieve the target set for MDG5 byUnited Nation. According to World Health Organization (WHO) estimation maternal death decreased from 523,000 in 1990 to 289,000 in 2013 globally which accounts for 45% reduction. It was reduced from 990,000 t0 510,000 for Sub-Saharan countries in the same year of interval with 49% reduction. In this report, maternal death in Ethiopia reduced from 43,300 to 13,000 from 1990 to 2013 indicating a reduction by 38% and with 4% contribution to the overall global maternal death. These figures indicate that reduction in maternal death in Ethiopia is below the overage for Sub-Saharan countries or the globe, despite the major progresses and achievements the country has made. Moreover, Ethiopia has not achieved the set MDG target for MMR. Having a goal and target initiates to put more efforts to identify barriers to quality maternal health services and address at all level of the health system or achievement of SDG. In order to meet the SDG target, Ethiopia has developed a five-year plan from the 2015/16 to 2019/20 to reduce maternal mortality ratio from 420 per 100,000s live birth to 199 per 100,000 live births. Similarly there are plans for the improvement of maternal health services in the same time duration.

References

Maternity in Ethiopia
Ethiopia
Health in Ethiopia